Ottavio Orlandi, known professionally as Otto Orlandi, is a recording artist, music producer, sound designer and ghost producer from Como, Italy. His musical output is a mixture of pop, dance and EDM. His biggest hits to date are his collaborations "Bells At Midnight" and "Don't Miss You". He is the owner of the company O Music S.r.l. which is divided into recording and management departments.

Background 
Otto Orlandi worked as a lighting designer at the Como Fashion Café nightclub and it was through this role he was inspired to learn about music production. He enrolled at the Music Academy of Como and graduated in sound design.

Artist career

Breakthrough 
In November 2014, Otto Orlandi had his first hit release. "Bells At Midnight" was a collaboration with Thomas Newson and featured vocals from Melanie Fontana. It was released by Marco V's record label In Charge, a sub-label of Dutch label Be Yourself Music. The track was played by some of the world's top DJs including Hardwell on his On Air radio show, by Nicky Romero on his Protocol radio show, by W&W on their Mainstage radio show and by Blasterjaxx. "Bells At Midnight" reached #3 on the Beatport Progressive house Top 100 chart and #23 on the Beatport overall Top 100.

2016–present 
Orlandi followed the success of "Bells At Midnight" with his next release "Sail Away". Released in January 2016 by Spanish label Blanco Y Negro Music, the track featured vocals written by American songwriter Curtis Richa and performed by Dutch singer-songwriter Allan Eshuijs (under his S-House alias). "Sail Away" was premiered by Nicky Romero on his Protocol radio show and reached #9 on the Beatport Progressive house Top 100 chart. Following this release, he signed a publishing deal with MusicAllStars Publishing (a sister company of Spinnin' Records).

In September 2016, Orlandi's collaboration with Fergie DJ titled "Hurts So Good" was released by Gareth Emery's record label Garuda, a sub-label of Dutch label Armada Music. The track was premiered by Don Diablo on his Hexagon radio show. The "Radio Edit" reached 13 on the Nexus Radio Dance Chart and the "Extended Mix" entered the Beatport Electro house Top 100 chart.

Orlandi began 2017 with his second release on the Garuda record label, "The Primitives", a collaboration with Taao Kross. The track received DJ support from David Guetta and Dannic.

Otto Orlandi's best-selling release to date came in February 2017 with the release of "Don't Miss You", through his own O Music Records label. "Don't Miss You" was a collaboration with Swedish duo ManyFew, with vocals from Melanie Fontana. This was the second time Melanie Fontana had appeared on an Otto Orlandi track. The track entered the iTunes Italy Top 10 and peaked at #7 whilst spending a total of 55 days on the top 100. The track went on to record over 2 million plays on Spotify.

In June 2017, Orlandi released "Volcano", featuring ADN. This was his second collaboration with songwriter Curtis Richa. This was followed in July by "Seven Days", his third collaboration with singer and songwriter Melanie Fontana.

Ghost producer 
Otto Orlandi has worked as a ghost producer for multiple artists in various genres including mainstream dance music. He has produced music for several artists signed to Sony Music and Universal Music. His ghost producer career has led to him to work at Capitol Records in Los Angeles, Abbey Road Studios in London and X-Level Studios in Stockholm.

Record label 
O Music Recordings was founded by Otto Orlandi in 2016 and releases pop and dance music.

Discography

Singles

References

External links

Italian record producers
Living people
People from Como
1992 births